"Little Sister Leaving Town" is a song by British singer-songwriter Tanita Tikaram, released in 1990 as the second single from her second studio album The Sweet Keeper. It was written by Tikaram, and produced by Peter van Hooke and Rod Argent.

The song's music video was produced and directed by Alan Bell, and scripted by Colin Welland. It was filmed in the Yorkshire Dales.

Critical reception
Upon its release, Music & Media wrote: "Pleasant, slow-moving and characteristically contemplative. The song profits from a strong arrangement. Good use of piano and strings." Everett True of Melody Maker commented: "Well, this ain't so bad – the cello's keen, and suits her mournful countenance just peachy." Andrew Collins of New Musical Express wrote, "She writes very dreary songs, of which the slow ones are by far the dreariest, and then sings them in a crap way. 'Little Sister' is a slow one. It perks up for one bar when it threatens to turn into 'Downtown Train', but this is merely a tease."

In a review of The Sweet Keeper, Robin Denselow of The Guardian described the song as "slinky and finger-clicking" which "head[s] towards soulful Van Morrison territory." Holly Crenshaw of The Atlanta Constitution described the song as "typical of the album's feel" and added: "Ms. Tikaram slowly uses the dynamics of her deep voice and evocative instrumentation to build up to an emotional chorus." Edith Lee of the Journal & Courier wrote: "Tikaram's deep, rich voice is highlighted in "Little Sister Leaving Town". She gets full music from the orchestra and bass heavy enough to make this slow song swing."

Brant Houston of the Hartford Courant commented: ""It All Came Back Today" and "Little Sister Leaving Town" are easily two of the best cuts, both with memorable choruses and each elegiac and moving." Sam Gnerre of the News-Pilot commented: "Tikaram apparently had no trouble coming up with lyrics; if anything, the songs come off as too wordy and meandering. "Little Sister Leaving Town" works by taking a less-is-more approach, but it's definitely an exception."

Track listing
7" single
"Little Sister Leaving Town" - 3:59
"Love Story" - 2:51

12" and CD single
"Little Sister Leaving Town" - 3:59
"I Love The Heaven's Solo" - 2:51
"Hot Pork Sandwiches" - 4:12

CD single (limited edition release)
"Little Sister Leaving Town" - 3:59
"I Love The Heaven's Solo" - 2:51
"Hot Pork Sandwiches" - 4:12
"Twist in My Sobriety" (Live) - 4:50

Personnel
 Tanita Tikaram - vocals, guitar
 Rod Argent - keyboards, bass
 Peter Van Hooke - drums
 Kreisler String Orchestra

Production
 Peter van Hooke, Rod Argent - producers, mixing
 Simon Hurrell - engineer, mixing

Other
 T & CP Associates - design, illustration
 Deborah Feingold - photography

Charts

References

1990 songs
1990 singles
Tanita Tikaram songs
Songs written by Tanita Tikaram
Song recordings produced by Rod Argent
East West Records singles